The 1861 Ohio gubernatorial election was held on October 8, 1861. National Union nominee David Tod defeated Democratic nominee Hugh J. Jewett with 57.68% of the vote.

General election

Candidates
David Tod, National Union
Hugh J. Jewett, Democratic

Results

References

1861
Ohio